Charles I. Dawson (February 13, 1881 – April 24, 1969) was a United States district judge of the United States District Court for the Western District of Kentucky.

Education and career

Born on February 13, 1881, in Logan County, Kentucky, Dawson attended the University of Kentucky and read law in 1905. He entered private practice in Russellville, Kentucky from 1905 to 1906. He continued in private practice in Pineville, Kentucky starting in 1906. He was a member of the Kentucky House of Representatives in 1906. He was the county attorney of Bell County, Kentucky from 1910 to 1920. Dawson was the Attorney General of Kentucky from 1920 to 1924. Dawson was a member of the Democratic Party until 1909, and a member of the Republican Party from 1909.

Federal judicial service

Dawson was nominated by President Calvin Coolidge on January 2, 1925, to a seat on the United States District Court for the Western District of Kentucky vacated by Judge Charles H. Moorman. He was confirmed by the United States Senate on January 13, 1925, and received his commission the same day. His service terminated on June 30, 1935, due to his resignation.

Later career and death

Dawson resumed private practice in Louisville, Kentucky from 1935 to 1969. He died on April 24, 1969. He was interred in Cave Hill Cemetery in Louisville.

Unsuccessful political campaigns

In 1923 Dawson, still serving as attorney general, was the Republican nominee for Governor of Kentucky. The Democratic nominee, J. Campbell Cantrill, suddenly died that September, after defeating Alben Barkley for the nomination. Democrat William J. Fields quickly replaced Cantrill on the ticket after Barkley declined the nomination. Dawson lost the general election to Fields, winning 306,277 votes (46.2%) to Fields' 356.035 (53.8%).

In 1950 Dawson was the Republican nominee for a seat in the United States Senate. Dawson lost that race to Democrat Earle C. Clements, who won 300,276 votes (53.9%) to Dawson's 256,876 (46.1%). Clements went on to become the assistant majority floor leader under Lyndon B. Johnson, serving as Majority Leader of the United States Senate during Johnson's extended absence due to medical reasons.

References

Sources

External links
 Dawson at Political Graveyard

1881 births
1969 deaths
Judges of the United States District Court for the Western District of Kentucky
United States district court judges appointed by Calvin Coolidge
20th-century American judges
Kentucky Attorneys General
Members of the Kentucky House of Representatives
People from Russellville, Kentucky
Kentucky Republicans
People from Bell County, Kentucky
United States federal judges admitted to the practice of law by reading law
Kentucky Democrats
Burials at Cave Hill Cemetery